The Hits is the first compilation album by American country music artist Hal Ketchum, released on May 7, 1996. It briefly appeared on Billboard'''s Top Country Albums chart, peaking at No. 43. Three songs were newly recorded for this collection, "Satisfied Mind", the Bob Ferguson cover "Wings of a Dove", and "Hang in There Superman". Also included is "I Miss My Mary", an album cut from Ketchum's debut album Past the Point of Rescue''.

Track listing

Production on new tracks
As listed in liner notes
Produced by Allen Reynolds and Jim Rooney
Recorded and Mixed by Mark Miller
Mastered by Denny Purcell at Georgetown Masters, Nashville, TN
Digital editing by Carlos Grier

Personnel on new tracks
As listed in liner notes

Hang in There Superman
Mark Casstevens - acoustic guitar
Dan Dugmore - Pedal steel guitar
Mike Leech - bass guitar
Delbert McClinton - harmonica
George Marinelli - electric guitar
Milton Sledge - drums
Bobby Wood - Wurlitzer electric piano

Background vocals: The W.O. Smith Nashville Community Singers (Angela Barlow, Esther Beckford, Merle Harden, Merlicia Harden, Tamica Head, Marquita Holt, Leslie Williams, Kameka Word) and "Metropolis Singers" (Delbert McClinton, Bobby Wood, Roger Cook, Jim Rooney, Tony Arata, Sandy Mason, Benita Hill, Matt Lindsey, Richard Aspinwall, Julie B. Freeman, Terrell Ketchum, Josh Allen, Mary Todd-Roberts, Charles Green, TerryPalmer, Randy Handley, Sarah Miller, Debbie Miller, Herb McCullough, Debbie Nims)

Satisfied Mind
Chris Leuzinger - electric guitar
Russ Pahl - acoustic guitar
Milton Sledge - drums
Pete Wasner - piano
Bobby Wood - organ
Bob Wray - bass guitar
Strings by The Nashville String Machine arranged by Charles Cochran

Wings of a Dove
Richard Bennett - acoustic guitar
Stuart Duncan - mandolin
Chris Leuzinger - electric guitar
Ruby Lovett - background vocals
Scott Neubert - acoustic guitar
Milton Sledge - drums
Pete Wasner - piano
Bob Wray - bass guitar

Chart performance

Sources

1996 greatest hits albums
Hal Ketchum albums
Albums produced by Allen Reynolds
Curb Records compilation albums